Julie's Greenroom is an American educational pre-school television series that was released on Netflix on March 17, 2017.

Characters
 Miss Julie (portrayed by Julie Andrews) – The director of the Wellspring Center for the Performing Arts. She teaches performing arts in its theater and "greenroom."
 Gus (portrayed by Giullian Yao Gioiello) – Miss Julie's assistant and a graduate of the Greenies workshop.
 The Greenies – A diverse group of kids that are mesmerized by all the arts and creativity that they are offered.
Hugo the Duck (performed by Tyler Bunch) – A domesticated duck.
 Hank (performed by John Tartaglia) – A paraplegic member of the Greenies.
 Fizz (performed by Dorien Davies) – Member of the Greenies.
 Peri (performed by Stephanie D'Abruzzo) – A showy, starstruck, and aspiring singer and actress.
 Riley (performed by Jennifer Barnhart) – a non-binary member who is an aspiring actor and mechanic.
 Spike (performed by Frankie Cordero) – Hank's friend and a fan of words and rhyming.
 Toby the Dog (performed by John Kennedy) – A dog.

Production
The show stars Julie Andrews (best known as the star of The Sound of Music and Mary Poppins), who is joined by her assistant Gus (Giullian Yao Gioiello) and "The Greenies", a cast of original puppets built by The Jim Henson Company.

The episodes include elements of the performing arts, such as an original song. Each episode features a guest star who engages the puppets in a specific area of the performing arts. Guest stars include Alec Baldwin, Sara Bareilles, Joshua Bell, Tituss Burgess, Carol Burnett, Chris Colfer, Robert Fairchild, Josh Groban, Bill Irwin, Ellie Kemper, Idina Menzel, Tiler Peck, David Hyde Pierce, Stomp, Mary Scheer, and the Story Pirates.

The thirteen 30-minute episodes premiered simultaneously on Netflix on March 17, 2017.

The series’ original score was composed by Ryan Shore.

Episodes

References

External links
 
  on Netflix

2017 American television series debuts
2017 American television series endings
2010s American children's television series
English-language Netflix original programming
American preschool education television series
American television shows featuring puppetry
2010s preschool education television series
Television series by The Jim Henson Company
Netflix children's programming
Television series about children
Television series about educators